Lung cancer susceptibility 3 is a protein that in humans is encoded by the LNCR3 gene.

References 

Human proteins